George Harrison (18 July 1892 – 12 February 1939) was an English international footballer who played as an outside left.

Early and personal life
Harrison was born in Church Gresley in Derbyshire. He was also known as Jud Harrison. He had two older siblings, and four younger siblings. He had a son (also called George) born in June 1912, and married in May 1913.

Club career
Harrison spent his early career with Gresley Rovers and Leicester Fosse. He played for Everton between 1913 and 1923. He won the First Division Championship with Everton in 1915. He was loaned to Rangers in December 1914, subsequently joining the Scots Guards. His football career was interrupted by World War One; Harrison joined the Army in February 1916 and served as a guardsman, being demobilised in October 1919. During the war he fought in the Battle of Passchendaele and was gassed. After leaving Everton in 1923 he played for Preston North End and Blackpool before retiring in 1932.

International career
He earned two caps for England in 1921, playing against Belgium in a 2–0 victory and against Ireland in a 1–1 draw.

Later life and death
He later became the licensee of a pub in Preston and also the licensee of the Rising Sun pub in Church Gresley.

He died on 12 February 1939 aged 46, with his funeral being held in Church Gresley four days later. He had been found by his son with throat wounds in the bathroom, and an inquest ruled the death as suicide, as he suffered from depression.

References

1892 births
1939 deaths
People from Church Gresley
Footballers from Derbyshire
English footballers
England international footballers
Gresley F.C. players
Leicester City F.C. players
Everton F.C. players
Rangers F.C. wartime guest players
Preston North End F.C. players
Blackpool F.C. players
English Football League players
Association football outside forwards
British Army personnel of World War I
Scots Guards soldiers
Suicides by sharp instrument in England
1939 suicides